Harry Warren Taylor (December 26, 1907 – April 27, 1969) was a professional baseball player who played as a first baseman for the 1932 Chicago Cubs of Major League Baseball (MLB).

Biography
Taylor's minor league baseball career spanned 1928 to 1943; he appeared in 1099 minor league games while playing for more than 10 different teams. He appeared in 10 games in the major leagues, with the Chicago Cubs in 1932, batting .125 (1-for-8) with one run scored. The Cubs released Taylor to the Reading Keystones of the International League at the end of May 1932. Late in his career, he served as player-manager of the Tiffin Mud Hens in 1941 and Jackson Senators in 1942.

"Handsome Harry" volunteered into the United States Navy during World War II and, although he took all of the combat training, because of his age and background as a professional athlete, he was made a fitness officer.  After the war he rejoined the Cubs organization for a short time and then became a businessman until his death from leukemia in 1969.  At the time of his death he was survived by his second wife, a son, a daughter and a granddaughter.

References

External links

1907 births
1969 deaths
Major League Baseball infielders
Chicago Cubs players
Ottumwa Packers players
Seattle Indians players
Reading Keystones players
Albany Senators players
Syracuse Chiefs players
Atlanta Crackers players
Chattanooga Lookouts players
Minneapolis Millers (baseball) players
Toledo Mud Hens players
Tiffin Mud Hens players
Jackson Senators players
Newark Bears players
Binghamton Triplets players
United States Navy personnel of World War II